The 1914–15 season was the 42nd season of competitive football in Scotland and the 25th season of the Scottish Football League. The addition of Lochgelly United and Clydebank meant that there were fourteen teams in Division Two.

Scottish League Division One

Champions: Celtic

Scottish League Division Two

Scottish Cup

There was no Scottish Cup competition played.

Other honours

National

County

. *replay

Junior Cup

Parkhead were winners of the Junior Cup after a 2–0 win over Port Glasgow Athletic Juniors.

Scotland national team

There were no Scotland matches played with the British Home Championship suspended due to World War I.

See also
1914–15 Aberdeen F.C. season
1914–15 Rangers F.C. season
Association football during World War I

Notes and references

External links
Scottish Football Historical Archive

 
Seasons in Scottish football
Wartime seasons in Scottish football